The Navy – Merchant Marine Memorial, located in Lady Bird Johnson Park on Columbia Island in Washington, D.C., is a monument honoring sailors of the United States Navy, Coast Guard, the United States Merchant Marine, the NOAA Commissioned Officer Corps and others who died at sea during World War I and other times. It was designed in 1922 by Harvey Wiley Corbett and sculpted by Ernesto Begni del Piatta, who died before it could be completed. It was cast in a foundry in Cleveland. The ground was broken on the memorial in 1930, with the foundation completed the following year and it was installed on October 18, 1934, but work on the base and landscaping was postponed due to lack of funding. A dedication ceremony was held on May 30, 1935. Funding was finally approved by Congress to finish the memorial in 1939 and work began anew the following September, to be completed by the end of the year.

Nicknamed "Waves and Gulls," the memorial depicts seven seagulls above the crest of a wave. It is cast from aluminum and the base is made of green granite from New Hampshire (the base was originally concrete but replaced by the Works Progress Administration). It stands 35 feet (10.6 m) tall and 30 feet (9.1 m) wide. It is the first aluminum memorial in Washington, DC.

The memorial reads:
To the strong souls and ready valor of those men of the United States who in the Navy, the Merchant Marine, and other paths of Activity upon the waters of the world have given life or still offer it in the performance of heroic deeds this monument is dedicated by a grateful people.

See also

 Other U.S. Navy memorials

References

External links

  includes Navy – Merchant Marine Memorial
 Photos of the Navy – Merchant Marine Memorial

World War I memorials in the United States
Monuments and memorials in Washington, D.C.
Military monuments and memorials in the United States
United States Merchant Marine
United States Navy
Outdoor sculptures in Washington, D.C.
1934 establishments in Washington, D.C.
Aluminum sculptures in Washington, D.C.
1934 sculptures
George Washington Memorial Parkway
Historic American Engineering Record in Virginia
Naval monuments and memorials
National Park Service areas in Washington, D.C.